Bryana Alicia Salaz (born August 25, 1997) is an American actress and singer. In 2014, she appeared on the seventh season of The Voice as part of Gwen Stefani's team. In 2019, she began portraying the role of Kaylie in the Netflix series Team Kaylie.

Early life and personal life
Born the daughter of Edward Salaz and raised in a military family, Salaz has moved every two to three years since she was born. This includes attending four high schools between her freshman and senior years. The many moves taught Salaz to easily adapt to her environment. Salaz is a lesbian and of Latina descent.

Career

Early days
Salaz's initial aspiration was not in music. For many years, her passion was playing soccer. She was 12 years old when her mom entered her in a military singing competition. Salaz reluctantly agreed to participate. With a lot of encouragement, she stepped onto the stage and discovered that not only did she love singing, she also loved being on stage. As a result of the competition, she was asked to perform at several venues in Hawaii such as Don Ho's Island Grill, Martin Luther King Jr. event at Kapiolani Park and she performed the American National Anthem for the D.A.R.E. program with an audience of about 10,000. She participated in multiple singing competitions and was awarded first place at the Iolani Talent Competition in 2010. She branched out into performing in musicals and auditioned for High School Musical 2 at the Ft. Shafter Richardson Theatre. Although she was allowed to audition, they told her she was too young for any of the roles. The director, impressed with the audition, created a role for her as the "Jr. Sharpettes." She went on to perform in several more musicals. Upon moving to Atlanta, Salaz continued performing in the theater and singing competitions. She auditioned for America's Got Talent in 2011 and advanced to the Las Vegas Rounds.

2014: The Voice
In September 2014, it was announced that Salaz would compete in Season 7 of The Voice on the advice of Gwen Stefani. On the first episode of Season 7, Salaz covered Ariana Grande's "Problem." Three coaches (Adam Levine, Gwen Stefani and Blake Shelton) turned around, though Pharrell Williams said that the only reason for not turning his chair was because he felt that she would connect more with Gwen than with himself. Salaz ended up choosing Gwen as her coach. At the Battle rounds, Salaz faced Gianna Salvato where they sang "Boom Clap." She was chosen over Salvato, in the process advancing to the Knockout rounds. During the Knockouts, Salaz sang "Heart Attack" in which she defeated her opponent Sugar Joans and advanced to The Live Playoffs. During the Playoffs, Salaz performed a rendition of 5 Seconds of Summer's "Amnesia." Though her performance was highly praised by the four coaches, especially her coach Gwen, Salaz saw herself being eliminated the following day on the Playoffs Results night, as her teammate, Ryan Sill, was chosen over her to advance to the Top 12. Her elimination, along with Taylor Phelan, was one of the most controversial of the night, as many believed that both were certain names for the Top 12.

 – Studio version of performance reached the top 10 on iTunes

2015: Sweet Suspense
On June 11, 2015, it was announced that Salaz became a member of the girl-band Sweet Suspense, replacing Celine Polenghi as the third member of The X Factor alum group. They were set to release a single; "Money" in 2015; however, in September, it was officially announced that she had left the group to pursue a career in TV, leaving the future of the group unclear.

2016: Best Friends Whenever, SNRG
In 2016, Salaz confirmed that she would be joining the second season of the Disney Channel show Best Friends Whenever portraying Princess Daisy. She also confirmed that she would be reuniting with Celine and former Sweet Suspense member Summer Reign, to form a new girl band called 'SNRG' and that they were talking to major record labels and film studios about their music. In May 2016, it was confirmed that she left SNRG.

Artistry

Influences
In addition to Ariana Grande and Gwen Stefani, Salaz's pop style is influenced by artists such as Christina Aguilera, Beyoncé and Whitney Houston.

Filmography

References

External links

1997 births
Living people
Musicians from Orlando, Florida
American women pop singers
American television actresses
American lesbian actresses
American lesbian musicians
American LGBT singers
LGBT people from Florida
LGBT Hispanic and Latino American people
Hispanic and Latino American actresses
Hispanic and Latino American singers
21st-century American actresses
The Voice (franchise) contestants
21st-century American women singers
American voice actresses
21st-century American singers
20th-century LGBT people
21st-century American LGBT people
Hispanic and Latino American women singers